The pectoral sparrow (Arremon taciturnus) is a species of bird in the family Passerellidae. It is found in Bolivia, Brazil, Colombia, French Guiana, Guyana, Peru, Suriname, and Venezuela. Its natural habitat is subtropical or tropical moist lowland forests. The Brazilian name for this species is tico-tico-de-bico-preto, which in translation means "black billed sparrow".

Taxonomy
The pectoral sparrow was described in 1779 by French polymath Georges-Louis Leclerc, Comte de Buffon in his Histoire Naturelle des Oiseaux under the French name "L'Oiseau Silencieux". It was also illustrated in a hand-coloured plate that was produced to accompany Buffon's book. Buffon did not use binomial names but in 1783 the French naturalist Johann Hermann coined the name Tanagra taciturna. The specific epithet taciturnus is the Latin word for "silent" or "quiet". The species is now placed in the genus Arremon that was erected by the French ornithologist Louis Jean Pierre Vieillot in 1816 with the pectoral sparrow as the type species.

Three subspecies are recognised:
 A. t. axillaris Sclater, PL, 1854 – northeast Colombia and west Venezuela
 A. t. taciturnus (Hermann, 1783) – east Colombia, central and south Venezuela, the Guianas, Amazonian Brazil and northeast Bolivia
 A. t. nigrirostris Sclater, PL, 1886 – southeast Peru and north Bolivia

Distribution and habitat
The species can be found everywhere in the Amazon Basin except for its western parts. Besides the Amazon jungle it is found in eastern and north-eastern Brazil.

References

External links
 Xeno-canto: audio recordings of the pectoral sparrow
Video of pectoral sparrow

pectoral sparrow
pectoral sparrow
Birds of the Amazon Basin
Birds of the Guianas
Birds of Brazil
pectoral sparrow
Taxonomy articles created by Polbot